Fairlight may refer to:

In places:
 Fairlight, East Sussex, a village east of Hastings in southern England, UK
 Fairlight, New South Wales, a suburb of Sydney, Australia
 Fairlight, Saskatchewan, Canada

In other uses:
 Fairlight (company), an Australian producer of synthesizers then digital audio tools
 Fairlight CMI, the first digital sampling synthesiser
 Fairlight (group), a Commodore 64, Amiga and PC demo group, as well as a warez group
 Fairlight (video game), a computer game by Bo Jangeborg, published by The Edge
 Fairlight (ferry), a Sydney to Manly ferry that operated between 1878 and 1914

See also
 Fairlight Cove, a small village on the East Sussex coast
 Fairlight Glen, a nudist beach on the East Sussex coast